The Grand Galet Falls (also called Langevin Falls after the name of its river) is situated in the commune of Saint-Joseph on the island of Réunion.

It is situated in the Réunion National Park, and its natural pool is a popular swimming and picnic place on weekends and holidays.

Waterfalls of Réunion
Saint-Joseph, Réunion
Réunion National Park
Cascade waterfalls